The Honeymoon Killers from Mars is the debut studio album of noise rock band The Honeymoon Killers, independently released in 1984 by Fur Records.

Release and reception 
Critics of the Trouser Press said the record was probably an entertaining collector's item at best, but "miss it, and you'll never get to hear the world's worst version of Bo Diddley's "Who Do You Love?""

Track listing

Personnel 
Adapted from The Honeymoon Killers from Mars liner notes.

The Honeymoon Killers
 Claire Lawrence-Slater – drums
 Michael O'Neill – electric guitar
 Jerry Teel – vocals, electric guitar, cover art, illustrations
 Lisa Wells – bass guitar

Production and additional personnel
 Matt Noble – mixing

Release history

References

External links 
 The Honeymoon Killers from Mars at Discogs (list of releases)

1984 debut albums
The Honeymoon Killers (American band) albums